Harttiella parva is a species of catfish in the family Loricariidae. It is native to South America, where it is known only from a small forest creek in the Atachi Bakka Mountains in French Guiana. The species reaches 3.1 cm (1.2 inches) in standard length. It was described in 2012 as part of a taxonomic review of members of the loricariid tribe Harttiini native to the Guianas.

References 

Fish described in 2012
Catfish of South America
Loricariidae
Fish of French Guiana